The Rivelin Valley artists  were a group of professional and amateur landscape artists in the early 1920s, based in the Rivelin Valley, Sheffield. The most prominent was Robert Scott-Temple. Others were William WE Goodrich, Ben Baines, Charles Edwin Dyson, Vernon Edwards and Charles Pigott.

Their work was shown and celebrated at Sheffield's Weston Park Gallery in July 2017.

References

Watermills
Sheffield